The Table Tennis Competition at the 2005 Mediterranean Games was held in the Máximo Cuervo Sports Hall  in Almería, Spain.

Men's competition

Men's singles

Men's doubles

Women's competition

Women's singles

Women's doubles

Medal table

References
Results

Table Tennis
2005
Mediterranean Games